Apisai Domolailai (born 16 April 1989) is a Fijian rugby union player. He plays for 's rugby sevens team. He was named in the squad to the 2016 Summer Olympics. He made his debut for Fiji in 2012.

He is the nephew of former Fijian international Isoa Domolailai.

References

External links

 
 

1989 births
Living people
Fijian rugby union players
Fiji international rugby sevens players
I-Taukei Fijian people
Rugby sevens players at the 2016 Summer Olympics
Olympic rugby sevens players of Fiji
Olympic gold medalists for Fiji
Male rugby sevens players
Olympic medalists in rugby sevens
Medalists at the 2016 Summer Olympics